Pauline's: Memoirs of The Madam on Clay Street was written by Pauline Tabor and published in 1971.

Biographical background and publication 
Tabor wrote about her own experience of running a successful brothel in her hometown in Bowling Green, Kentucky, recounting her many struggles within the conservative community and legal troubles.

References

Non-fiction books about American prostitution
American autobiographies
1971 non-fiction books
Bowling Green, Kentucky
Touchstone Books books